Venus the Flytrap is a post-apocalyptic side-scrolling video game released in 1990 for the Amiga and Atari ST.

Reception

Michael Labiner wrote in Amiga Joker magazine "Who has tried Venus remains stuck on the fly trap. [...] Gremlin has created an absolute top game [...]"

References

External links
Venus the Flytrap at Atari Mania
Venus the Flytrap at Lemon Amiga

1990 video games
Amiga games
Atari ST games
Gremlin Interactive games
Video games about insects
Video games developed in the United Kingdom
Single-player video games